Karina Verónica Banfi (born 27 February 1972) is an Argentine politician, currently serving as National Deputy elected in Buenos Aires Province since 2015. She is a member of the Radical Civic Union (UCR).

Early life and education
Banfi was born on 27 February 1972 in Bahía Blanca. She studied law at the University of Buenos Aires and has a postgraduate degree on Law and Compared Media Policies from Oxford University and another on Inter-American and International Human Rights Protection Systems from the Washington College of Law. She is married to Hernán Charosky and has two children.

Political career
Banfi served as Regional Coordinator of Transparency and Governance Programmes at the Organization of American States, and as advisor on Freedom of Expression at the Inter-American Commission on Human Rights.

Banfi ran for a seat in the Chamber of Deputies in the 2015 legislative election, as the tenth candidate in the Cambiemos list in Buenos Aires Province. The list came second with 33.75% of the vote, and Banfi was elected. She was re-elected in 2019, again as the tenth candidate in the Juntos por el Cambio list.

As a national deputy, Banfi formed part of the parliamentary commissions on Communications and Informatics, General Legislation, Constitutional Affairs, Human Rights and Guarantees, Freedom of Expression, Petitions, Powers and Norms, and Foreign Affairs. Banfi was a vocal supporter of the legalization of abortion in Argentina. She voted in favor of the two Voluntary Interruption of Pregnancy bills that were debated by the Argentine Congress in 2018 and 2020.

Electoral history

References

External links

Profile on the official website of the Chamber of Deputies (in Spanish)

Living people
1972 births
Members of the Argentine Chamber of Deputies elected in Buenos Aires Province
Women members of the Argentine Chamber of Deputies
People from Bahía Blanca
Radical Civic Union politicians
University of Buenos Aires alumni
Alumni of the University of Oxford
Washington College of Law alumni
21st-century Argentine politicians
21st-century Argentine women politicians